Sunbelt Publications is an American publication company that was incorporated in 1988. The company publishes and distributes multi-language pictorials, natural science and outdoor guidebooks, and regional references. The company is located in El Cajon, California.

History
Diana and Lowell Lindsay founded Sunbelt Books with the goal of publishing books about the natural world. The Anza-Borrego Desert was the subject for Diana Lindsay's master's thesis, and she subsequently published it as a book entitled Our Historic Desert (1973) through Copley Books.

Awards
Courage to Heal – Theodor S. Geisel Award 2007, San Diego Book Awards
 Courage to Heal – Historical Fiction, 2007 San Diego Book Awards
Palm Springs Legends: Creation of a Desert Oasis – 2012 Craft Awards, Outdoor Writers Association of California

References

Book publishing companies based in California
Small press publishing companies
Companies based in El Cajon, California
Publishing companies established in 1973
1973 establishments in California